Naan Sivanagiren is a 2011 Indian Tamil-language drama film written and directed by V. K. Gnanasekar. The film features Udhay Karthik and Varsha in the lead roles, alongside Adithya Menon and Prem Kumar. Produced by M N Creations, the film was released on 11 November 2011.

Cast 
 Udhay Karthik as Prabhakaran
 Varsha as Anitha
 Adithya Menon
 Prem Kumar
 Kadhal Sukumar
 Eeram Ram as Anitha's friend

Production 
The film marked the first Tamil venture for the producers, director, and lead actors. Major portions of the film was shot in 2010.

Soundtrack
The soundtrack had four songs composed by K. S. Manoj and written by Na. Muthukumar, Nishanth and K. S. Gnanasekar. The audio of the film was released by director M. Rajesh and was received by Rama Narayanan at a special event held in May 2011. At the same event, the film's trailer was released by director Suseenthiran, and was received by director Sasi, in the presence of chief guests, director S. P. Muthuraman, producer 'Sathyajothi' Thyagarajan and choreographer Kala.

Vaanum Mannum — Prasanna and Manoj
Nee Pogum — Haricharan
Kadhalillai' — Benny Dayal and Cisily
Cinemathan Engalukku — Ranjith, Rakesh and Vicky

Release and reception 
The film had a theatrical release across Tamil Nadu on 11 November 2011. A reviewer from entertainment portal Behindwoods noted "everything about the film is on a mediocre level. The story and screenplay are complete let downs. The camera work is highly inconsistent and the music is just passable. It is one of those movies which make you restless right from the start to finish." Critic Rohit Ramachandran of NowRunning wrote "Naan Sivanagiren is a deformed offspring produced by the interbreeding of Katradhu Thamizh and Anniyan", concluding it was a "feeble effort". A reviewer from DesiMartini wrote "for a movie which was supposed to be an edge of the seat psycho-thriller, there should have been an element of suspense spiced up with a racy screenplay. The suspicion element was broken even before the story started to unfold while the screen play limped every now and then halting the proceedings."

The film took a poor opening at the box office and underperformed commercially. The lead actor, Udhay Karthik, later appeared in films including Bala's Paradesi (2013) and the unreleased Ivaluga Imsai Thaanga Mudiyalai, which was shot in 2017. The director, Gnanasekar, later changed his name to Disney and made the film Irumbu Manithan (2020).

References

External links 

2010s Tamil-language films
2011 films
Indian thriller films
2011 directorial debut films